I Am a Dancer is a 1972 ballet film.

References

External links

I Am a Dancer at TCMDB

1972 films
EMI Films films
1970s English-language films